Meiko is the debut album by Meiko, released in 2008. An earlier version of this album was self-released in 2007.  The newer release features re-recorded versions of "Under My Bed" and "Said and Done", and adds Meiko's first single, "Boys with Girlfriends".  The 2007 self-release features a 'secret' track at the very end of the CD, which is a song called "You and Onions".

Track listing
All songs written and composed by Meiko. 
"Reasons to Love You" – 3:17
"How Lucky We Are" – 2:57
"Heard It All Before" – 3:55
"Boys with Girlfriends" – 4:07
"Piano Song" – 2:48
"Hiding" — 3:17
"Sleep" – 4:46
"Said and Done" – 3:27
"Walk By" – 3:46
"Under My Bed" – 3:48
"Hawaii" – 4:33

Charts

Album

Singles

References

Meiko (American singer) albums
2008 albums